Thomas Joseph Kane (December 15, 1906 – November 26, 1973), nicknamed "Sugar", was a professional baseball player.  He was a second baseman for one season (1938) with the Boston Bees.  For his career, he collected no hits in two at-bats with two walks in two games.

He was born and later died in Chicago at the age of 66.

External links

1906 births
1973 deaths
Boston Bees players
Major League Baseball second basemen
Minor league baseball managers
Birmingham Barons players
Helena Seaporters players
Little Rock Travelers players
Columbia Senators players
Scranton Miners players
Chattanooga Lookouts players
Hartford Laurels players
Selma Cloverleafs players
Baseball players from Chicago